Louis Dominique Joseph Armand Dunoyer de Segonzac (14 November 1880 – 27 August 1963) was a French physicist. He was awarded the Valz Prize by the French Academy of Sciences in 1929 for research on spirit levels and on photoelectric cells as applied to astronomy.

References

1880 births
1963 deaths
École Normale Supérieure alumni
Chevaliers of the Légion d'honneur
French physicists
Optical physicists